Operation Crosstie was a series of 48 nuclear tests conducted by the United States in 1967–1968 at the Nevada Test Site. These tests followed the Operation Latchkey series and preceded the Operation Bowline series.

Nuclear tests

Gasbuggy

The blast designated Gasbuggy involved an underground detonation, intended to stimulate production of natural gas by cracking the rock in the underground formation of its deposit. The test proceeded as expected, but not only did the production not increase as much as expected, but the customers also refused to buy gas contaminated with traces of radioisotopes.

Faultless

The Faultless test was a calibration test conducted in a mine cavity 3,200 feet beneath the Hot Creek Valley near Tonopah, Nevada, with a yield of around 1 megaton. This test was conducted to see if the land was fit for testing a 5 megaton thermonuclear warhead for the Spartan missile. The test failed because of the large degree of faulting that resulted in the area around the test. It was decided that the land was unfit for multi-megaton nuclear tests, so a similar calibration test was conducted at Amchitka Island, Alaska, in the fall of 1969 during Operation Mandrel.

The 8 foot diameter steel pipe that was used to place the bomb remains at the test site. The top of the pipe was originally flush with the surface; however, the ground sank by nine feet following the explosion. A plaque is mounted on the exposed pipe to commemorate the event.

Buggy

Buggy was a Plowshare test designed to excavate a channel.
. Or 65 feet deep and 254 feet wide, according to declassified U.S. film.

The USSR conducted a similar salvo-test to investigate the use of nuclear explosions in the construction of the Pechora–Kama Canal project.  On March 23, 1971, three simultaneously detonated 15 kiloton underground nuclear charges were exploded in the Taiga test.

Rickey
Rickey was the first Los Alamos test to use a television PINEX (pin-hole neutron experiment) system. A fluor was imaged using a newtonian telescope which was split for imaging by two cameras by a beam splitter. The instrument package containing the television system was protected from neutrons and gamma rays by kinking the path between it and the nuclear device and by placing baffles along the optical path pipe.

List of nuclear tests

The United States's Crosstie nuclear test series was a group of 48 nuclear tests conducted in 1967–1968. These tests  followed the Operation Latchkey series and preceded the Operation Bowline series.

References

Explosions in 1967
Explosions in 1968
Crosstie
1967 in military history
1968 in military history
1967 in Nevada
1968 in Nevada
1967 in the environment
1968 in the environment